General Frank B. Holman (August 17, 1930 – December 2, 2005) was an American Republican Party politician from New Jersey and was an advisor to many of the party's candidates.

Biography 
Holman was born on August 17, 1930 and raised in Ocean County. He served as Mayor of Jackson, New Jersey, as Ocean County Administrator, as Executive Director of the New Jersey Republican State Committee, and as the Chairman of the New Jersey Republican State Committee. He was a brigadier general in the United States Air Force Reserve. Mr. Holman also served in the U.S. Air Force during the Korean War. He eventually retired from the Air Force Reserve as a brigadier general.

Death
Holman died on Friday December 2, 2005 in Lakewood, New Jersey at the age of 75. Wayne Pomanowski, a friend of Frank, stated that Holman died while being treated for throat cancer. Mr. Holman was a cigar smoker for years which led to his apparent death from throat cancer.

References 

1930 births
2005 deaths
Chairmen of the New Jersey Republican State Committee
Mayors of places in New Jersey
New Jersey Republicans
People from Jackson Township, New Jersey
20th-century American politicians